Yaroomba is a coastal suburb in the Sunshine Coast Region, Queensland, Australia.

Geography 
The eastern boundary of the suburb is the Coral Sea, featuring a long strip of sand called Yaroomba Beach.

The Palmer Coolum Resort and Golf Course occupies about half the suburb, . The remainder is residential housing.

The David Low Way traverses the suburb from north-east to south-east.

History 
The suburb began life as a housing estate named Coronation Beach in 1953 in honour of the coronation of Queen Elizabeth II. The name was changed to Yaroomba, a Kabi word which means "surf on the beach", in 1961.

In 2007, a  piece of hardwood ribbing was found on the beach by Scott Patterson. It was uncovered due to a combination of high tides and rushing creek waters from recent heavy rain. It was part of the shipwrecked Kirkdale. It left Launceston in May 1862 bound for Colombo in Ceylon (now Sri Lanka) via the Torres Strait; however, after arriving at Cooktown, the captain turned and travelled south again and ran aground off Yaroomba Beach on 19 July 1862. The ship caught fire but the captain and crew members were able to launch a boat and survived.

Education 
There are no schools in Yaroomba, but the suburb is in the catchment for Coolum State School and Coolum State High School in neighbouring Coolum Beach.

The closest public library is in Coolum.

Amenities 
There are a number of parks in the suburb:

 Bimini Dr Park
 Birrahl Park

 Diamond Close Natural Amenity Reserve

 Donegal Drive Environmental Reserve

 Marcoola -Yaroomba Foreshore Bushland Conservation Reserve

 Meadowlands Park

 Opel Pl Drainage E/ment

 Warran Road Natural Amenity Reserve

 Yaroomba Bushland 1 Park

 Yaroomba Bushland 2 Park

 Yaroomba Bushland Park Bushland Conservation Reserve

References

External links

 

Suburbs of the Sunshine Coast Region
Coastline of Queensland